The Mimmi series  is a children's books series written by Viveca Lärn (earlier Viveca Sundvall). The main character is Mimmi, a girl in late Kindergarten, later early primary school, age. The books are told from the me-perspective, many of them as diaries. The books were originally published between 1979 and 1996. 

Mimmi lives with her family in Kungälv. Her father Oskar is a postman while her mother Elin is a waitress at restaurant "Gyllene Svanen".

Two television series based on the books have been produced, En ettas dagbok from 1985 and Mimmi från 1988.

Books

References

 
Swedish children's book series
Book series introduced in 1979